Asira was a local god worshipped in pre-Islamic northern Arabia. He was revered at Taima and was strongly influenced by Egyptian culture. Asira was mentioned only in name by the Babylonian king Nabonidus.

References 
 Encyclopedia of Gods, Michael Jordan, Kyle Cathie Limited, 2002

Arabian gods